This article compares the presidential candidates in the United States' 2008 presidential election. It does not cover previous elections. Because of ballot access restrictions in the United States, not all candidates appeared on the ballots in all states.

Candidates 

Those who were on the ballot in enough states to theoretically win a majority in the U.S. Electoral College are marked in bold. Candidates who are known to have appeared on at least two states' ballots are marked in italic.

Biographical data

Economic issues

Tax policy

The third-party candidates' tax plans were not studied by mainstream media outlets and the Tax Policy Center.  Chuck Baldwin supports replacing the income tax with a 10% across-the-board tariff on imported goods. Bob Barr supports replacing the income tax with a consumption tax (the FairTax). The details of his exact plan are not known but consumption taxes tend to be regressive unless accompanied by a negative income tax for the poor to offset necessary expenditures. Cynthia McKinney supports sharply progressive taxation, with higher taxes for the rich and a tax cut for the middle class.

Financial crisis and bailout

Trade

Health care

Taxation and budget deficit

Social Security

Network neutrality

Lobbying

Transportation

Labor

Monetary policy

NASA and space exploration

Foreign policy

Arab–Israeli conflict

Iraq

Iran

Darfur

Nuclear weapons

North Korea

Pakistan

Extrajudicial prisoners

Armenian genocide

China

Foreign aid

Georgia

United Nations

Energy and environmental issues

The environment

Energy

Domestic issues

Judiciary

Same-sex marriage

Abortion

Gun control

Death penalty

Immigration

Racial justice

Federal funding for embryonic stem cell research

Education

Patriot Act

See also 
 Democratic Party (United States) presidential candidates, 2008
 Republican Party (United States) presidential candidates, 2008
 United States third party and independent presidential candidates, 2008
 Political positions of John McCain
 Political positions of Barack Obama
 Political positions of Joe Biden
 Political positions of Sarah Palin
 Political positions of Cynthia McKinney
 Political positions of Bob Barr
 United States federal budget

References 

2008 United States presidential election